Darreh Geru-ye Olya (also Romanized as Darreh Gerū-ye ‘Olyā; also known as Darreh Gerūh Bālā, Darreh Gerū-ye Bālā, and Darreh Gorūh ‘Olyā) is a village in Bahmayi-ye Sarhadi-ye Sharqi Rural District, Dishmok District, Kohgiluyeh County, Kohgiluyeh and Boyer-Ahmad Province, Iran. At the 2006 census, its population was 205, in 39 families.

References 

Populated places in Kohgiluyeh County